Conway is a city in the U.S. state of Arkansas and the county seat of Faulkner County, located in the state's most populous Metropolitan Statistical Area, Central Arkansas. Although considered a suburb of Little Rock, Conway is unusual in that the majority of its residents do not commute out of the city to work. The city also serves as a regional shopping, educational, work, healthcare, sports, and cultural hub for Faulkner County and surrounding areas. Conway's growth can be attributed to its jobs in technology and higher education; among its largest employers being Acxiom, the University of Central Arkansas, Hendrix College, Insight Enterprises, and many technology start-up companies. Conway is home to three post-secondary educational institutions, earning it the nickname "The City of Colleges".

As of the 2010 census, the city proper had a total population of 58,908, making Conway the eighth-largest city in Arkansas. Central Arkansas, the Little Rock–North Little Rock–Conway, AR Metropolitan Statistical Area, is ranked 75th largest in the United States with 734,622 people in 2016. Conway is part of the larger Little Rock–North Little Rock, AR Combined Statistical Area, which in 2016 had a population of 905,847, and ranked the country's 60th largest CSA.

History 
The city of Conway was founded by Asa P. Robinson, who came to the area shortly after the Civil War. Robinson was the chief engineer for the Little Rock-Fort Smith Railroad (now the Union Pacific). Part of his compensation was the deed to a tract of land, one square mile, located near the old settlement of Cadron. When the railroad came through, Robinson deeded a small tract of his land back to the railroad for a depot site. He laid off a town site around the depot and named it "Conway Station" in honor of a famous Arkansas family. Conway Station contained two small stores, two saloons, a depot, some temporary housing, and a post office. Despite being founded as a railroad town, there is currently no passenger service; this is attributed to the increasing emphasis placed on cars.

In 1878, Father Joseph Strub, a priest in the Roman Catholic Holy Ghost Fathers, arrived in Arkansas. A native of Alsace-Lorraine, Strub was expelled from Prussia during the Kulturkampf in 1872. He moved to the United States, settling in Pittsburgh, where he founded Duquesne University in October 1878. Difficulties with Bishop John Tuigg led Strub to leave Pittsburgh in late October 1878 to travel to Conway. In 1879, Strub convinced the Little Rock and Fort Smith Railroad to deed  along the northern side of the Arkansas River to the Holy Ghost Fathers in order to found the St. Joseph Colony. This included land on which Father Strub founded and built St. Joseph Catholic Church of Conway. As part of the land deal, the railroad offered land at 20 cents per acre to every German immigrant. In order to attract Roman Catholic Germans to Conway and the surrounding areas, Father Strub wrote The Guiding Star for the St. Joseph Colony. In addition to extolling the qualities of Conway and the surrounding area, Father Strub provided information on how best to travel from Europe to Conway. By 1889, over 100 German families had settled in Conway, giving the town many of its distinctively German street and business names.

On April 10, 1965, an F4 tornado struck Conway, causing six deaths and 200 injuries.

Geography 
Conway is located in southwestern Faulkner County. Interstate 40 passes through the north and east sides of the city, with access from Exits 124 through 132. West (307 km) of Oklahoma City

Climate
The climate in this area is characterized by hot, humid summers and generally mild to cool winters. According to the Köppen Climate Classification system, Conway has a humid subtropical climate, abbreviated "Cfa" on climate maps.

Demographics

2020 census

As of the 2020 United States census, there were 64,134 people, 26,319 households, and 14,609 families residing in the city.

2010 census
As of the census of 2010, there were 58,908 people, 23,205 households, and 13,969 families residing in the city. The racial makeup of the city was 77.4% White, 15.6% Black or African American, 0.4% Native American, 1.9% Asian, 0.1% Pacific Islander, 2.4% from other races, and 2.2% from two or more races. 5.1% of the population were Hispanic or Latino of any race.

There were 23,205 households, out of which 33.1% had children under the age of 18 living with them, 43.2% were married couples living together, 12.8% had a female householder with no husband present, and 39.8% were non-families. 27.0% of all households were made up of individuals, and 7.0% had someone living alone who was 65 years of age or older. The average household size was 2.45 and the average family size was 3.01.

In the city, the population was spread out, with 22.7% under the age of 18, 22.9% from 18 to 24, 27.2% from 25 to 44, 18.5% from 45 to 64, and 8.7% who were 65 years of age or older. The median age was 27.3 years. There were 51.7% females and 48.3% males. For ages under 18, there were 49.2% females and 50.8% males.

The median income for a household in the city was $42,640, and the median income for a family was $63,860. The per capita income for the city was $42,582. About 9.3% of families and 16.3% of the population were below the poverty line, including 15.0% of those under age 18 and 10.8% of those age 65 or over.

47.6% of Conway's population describes themselves as religious, slightly below the national average of 48.8%. 44.5% of people in Conway who describe themselves as having a religion are Baptist (21.7% of the city's total population). 9.2% of people holding a religion are Catholic (4.5% of the city's total population). The proportions of Methodists and Pentecostals are higher than the national average.

Economy
Conway was home to one of the world's largest school bus manufacturers, IC Corporation. The Conway plant was one of only two IC manufacturing plants; the other is located in Tulsa, Oklahoma. IC Corporation is a wholly owned subsidiary of Navistar International Corporation of Lisle, Illinois. IC was previously known as American Transportation (AmTran) Corporation and Ward Body Works. The company was founded in 1933. IC Corporation closed its plant and moved all bus manufacturing operations to its Tulsa plant in 2010, largely due to incentives offered by the city of Tulsa.

R. D. "Bob" Nabholz founded Nabholz Construction in Conway in 1949. It currently employs over 800 people and has been listed by Engineering News-Record (ENR) magazine as one of the Top 400 General Contractors every year since 1986. Currently, the company is ranked #161. Conway Corporation handles the local utilities (cable TV, Internet, and telephone services, in addition to electricity and water) for the city of Conway.

Acxiom Corporation, an interactive marketing services company, was founded in 1969 in Conway.

On June 19, 2008, Hewlett-Packard announced it would be opening a  facility with 1,200 employees in 2009. The building, built by Nabholz Construction and located in the Meadows Office and Technology Park, has since been abandoned by HP and is now leased to Gainwell Technologies.

On December 16, 2021, Arkansas-based company Westrock Coffee announced the planned opening of a new plant in Conway. The company purchased a  facility that is expected to create 250 jobs.

Top employers
Updated March 2016

Government and politics

Mayor–city council
Conway operates within the mayor–city council form of government. The mayor is elected by a citywide election to serve as the city's chief executive officer (CEO) by presiding over all city functions, policies, rules, and laws. Once elected, the mayor also allocates duties to city employees. The Conway mayoral election coincides with the election of the President of the United States. Mayors serve four-year terms and can serve unlimited terms.

The city council is the unicameral legislative of the City, consisting of two members from each of the city's four wards. Also included in the council's duties is balancing the city's budget and passing ordinances. The body also controls the representatives of specialized city commissions underneath their jurisdiction.

Arts and culture

The Conway Symphony Orchestra performs many times throughout the year, and the Conway Community Arts Association has been presenting theatre and other art opportunities to the community for over 40 years. The Arkansas Shakespeare Theatre, based in Conway, is the state's only professional Shakespeare theater. It holds an annual summer festival in June.

There are also art, music, and theater opportunities provided by Conway's three colleges. The University of Central Arkansas's Public Appearances program provides dance, music, and theater offerings each year.

The national award-winning community theatre, The Lantern Theatre, is located downtown and offers a wide variety of plays and musicals year-round.

Conway Public Schools have theater and music programs, with large concert and marching bands that consistently receive high marks in regional competitions.

One of the city's largest annual events, Toad Suck Daze, has been held since 1982. The three-day community festival incorporates live music, food and craft vendors, and amusement rides during the first weekend of May. Proceeds from the festival fund college scholarships for local students.

The Faulkner County Museum focuses on the prehistory, history, and culture of Faulkner County. Located inside the former Faulkner County Jail, it displays photos, artifacts, equipment, household items, clothing, and arts and crafts by local artists. The museum also holds an annual open house that showcases interactive demonstrations and various crafts.

Conway is a popular sport-fishing destination and is home to the largest man-made Game and Fish Commission lake in the United States. Lake Conway, holds largemouth bass, crappie, gar, catfish, bream, bowfin, and others. The Arkansas Crappie Masters state tournament is held here every year.

The city held its first-ever EcoFest on September 12, 2009, in Laurel Park. EcoFest included exhibits and events relating to "green" and sustainable initiatives, including a cardboard car derby and an alleycat bicycle ride. According to organizers led by Debbie Plopper, the event was a success. Mayor Tab Townsell said the event indicated to him that "interest in sustainability is flourishing in this community."

Libraries 

The Faulkner-Van Buren Regional Library System serves the city, a two-county library system formed in 1954. Originally the city was served by the Conway Library from 1935 until the merger into the current system. Today, the Conway Library serves as the headquarters for the eight-library regional system.

In addition to this, the students of the University of Central Arkansas and Hendrix College have free access to both the Torreyson Library at UCA and the Bailey Library at Hendrix by showing a current student ID from their respective college.

Parks and recreation
There are the 15 parks located within Conway.

Education

College and Universities 

Conway is home to three institutions of higher learning, earning it the nickname City of Colleges. The University of Central Arkansas is a public research university with an enrollment of approximately 12,000 students. It is well known for its Norbert O. Schedler Honors College, being one of the first and most-modeled-after honor colleges in the United States. Hendrix College is a nationally recognized private liberal arts college with an enrollment just over 1,300 students. With an average composite ACT score of 29, it is the highest of any college in the state. Central Baptist College is a four-year private liberal arts college with an enrollment of nearly 900 students. These colleges together contribute to over 40 percent of Conway's adult workforce having a bachelor's degree or higher, making it one of the most educated cities in the state.

Primary and secondary education 

The Conway Public School District serves the city. It is overseen by the Conway Board of Education, composed of seven citizens elected every third Tuesday in September annually in a citywide vote.  Operating with a $88 million budget, the district enrolls approximately 10,000 students, making it the eighth largest in the state. The district consists of 16 schools: 1 pre-school, 9 elementary schools, 4 middle schools, 1 junior high school, and 1 high school. Over 65 percent of teachers in Conway Public Schools hold a master's degree or higher, and 67 are National Board Certified.

Conway is also served by two private religious schools, Conway Christian School and St. Joseph Catholic School. Conway Christian has an approximate enrollment of 400 students, while St. Joseph School enrolls about 500 students. Conway previously had a Catholic grade school for black children, Good Shepherd School; it closed in 1965.

Notable people
 Kris Allen, winner of American Idol Season 8 
 Kayle Browning, silver medalist in the 2020 Olympics in trap shooting
 Monte Coleman, NFL linebacker; Washington Redskins 1979–94, 3-time Super Bowl champion, attended the University of Central Arkansas 1975-1978
 Tyree Davis, professional football player
 Willie Davis, NFL wide receiver; Kansas City Chiefs 1991–95, Houston Oilers 1996, Tennessee Oilers 1997–98, attended the University of Central Arkansas 1987-90; older brother of Tyree Davis
 Marvin Delph, Arkansas Razorback basketball player; one of the famed "Triplets" who led Hogs to 1978 NCAA Final Four
 George Washington Donaghey, former Arkansas Governor from 1909 to 1913
Hetty Jane Dunaway, actress and founder of Dunaway Gardens, born in Conway
 Les Eaves, state representative for White County since 2015; born in Conway
 Erin Enderlin, country music artist and songwriter
 Orval Faubus, 36th Governor of Arkansas, resided in his later years in Conway
 Jacob Ford, NFL defensive end; Tennessee Titans 2007–10, attended the University of Central Arkansas 2003-06  
 Max Frauenthal, Civil War hero, leading Conway merchant and founding father of Heber Springs
 Reggie Gavin, also known as drag queen Symone, winner of the thirteenth season of RuPaul's Drag Race.
 Gil Gerard, actor known for title role in the TV series Buck Rogers
 Jack Graham, pastor of Prestonwood Baptist Church, one of the largest Southern Baptist churches in America
 Dutch Harrison, golfer
 Gene Hatfield, artist and writer
 Peyton Hillis, NFL football running back; Arkansas Razorbacks 2004–07, Denver Broncos 2008–10, Cleveland Browns 2010–2011, Kansas City Chiefs 2012, New York Giants 2013–14
 V. E. Howard, Church of Christ minister who founded the radio International Gospel Hour; was a clergyman early in his career in Conway
 James D. Johnson (d. 2010), late Chief Justice of the Arkansas Supreme Court and 1966 Democratic gubernatorial nominee
 Guy H. Jones, Arkansas state senator
 Bryce Molder, PGA Tour professional golfer
 Hiroyuki Nishimura, founded the Japanese website 2channel while studying at the University of Central Arkansas
 Scottie Pippen, NBA basketball forward, Chicago Bulls 1987-98 and 2003–2004, Houston Rockets 1998–99, Portland Trail Blazers 1999–2003, six-time NBA champion, considered one of the 50 greatest NBA players of all time; attended the University of Central Arkansas
 Elijah Pitts, NFL football running back; Green Bay Packers 1960s, rushed for two TDs in Super Bowl I
 Stanley Russ, state senator
 Charlie Strong, NCAA Head football coach of The University of South Florida Bulls; (1980–1983) letterman as a defensive back at the University of Central Arkansas
 Little Johnny Taylor, blues and soul singer
 Ray Thornton, former U.S. congressman and former justice of the Arkansas Supreme Court
 Jordan Wicks, former Conway High School &  Kansas State alumni. First round (pick #21) selection (2021 Major League Baseball draft), for the Chicago Cubs organization.

Sister cities
Conway has one official sister city agreement with the city of Quakenbrueck, Germany. In 1986, the first exchange of visitors occurred between the cities. Starting in 1992, Dr. Oudekerk, a professor from Hendrix College, has taken several groups to the sister city in Germany. Since then, the high schools of each city have exchanged students to experience different cultures. The 25-year anniversary of the relationship was recently celebrated with a festival in Quakenbrueck with the theme of building bridges across the Atlantic.
 Quakenbrueck, Lower Saxony, Germany 1985

Notes

References

External links

 Access Conway, the official government website of the City of Conway
 Conway Area Chamber of Commerce official website

 
Populated places established in 1872
Cities in Faulkner County, Arkansas
Cities in Arkansas
County seats in Arkansas
Cities in Little Rock–North Little Rock–Conway metropolitan area
1872 establishments in Arkansas
Arkansas populated places on the Arkansas River